Living in America may refer to:

 "Living in America" (James Brown song), a song performed by James Brown
 Living in America (album), an album by The Sounds
 "Living in America", a song by American electric band DoM. Features in Grand Theft Auto V on Radio Mirror Park.
 "Living in America", a song on the 2020 album A Hero's Death by Fontaines D.C.
 "Living in America" (The Sounds song)